David Michael may refer to:

David Michael (politician), member of the Western Australian Legislative Assembly
David Tibet (David Michael Bunting, born 1960), British poet and artist
David Moritz Michael (1751–1827), composer
David Michael & Co., an American food science company
David Michael (rugby league)